Acanthopale decempedalis is a species of plant in the family Acanthaceae. It is found in Cameroon, Equatorial Guinea, and Nigeria. Its natural habitats are subtropical or tropical moist lowland forests and subtropical or tropical moist montane forests.

References

Acanthaceae
Vulnerable plants
Taxonomy articles created by Polbot